Wendy Chase is a New Hampshire politician.

Education
Chase attended Northeastern University.

Career
On November 6, 2018, Chase was elected to the New Hampshire House of Representatives where she represents the Strafford 18 district. Chase assumed office on December 5, 2018. Chase is a Democrat. Chase endorses Bernie Sanders in the 2020 Democratic Party presidential primaries.

Personal life
Chase resides in Rollinsford, New Hampshire. Chase is married and has two children.

References

Living people
Women state legislators in New Hampshire
Northeastern University alumni
People from Rollinsford, New Hampshire
Democratic Party members of the New Hampshire House of Representatives
21st-century American women politicians
21st-century American politicians
Year of birth missing (living people)